Currian Vale is a hamlet northeast of Nanpean, in mid Cornwall, England. At the 2011 census the population was included in the civil parish of St Stephen-in-Brannel

References

Hamlets in Cornwall